The Mercedes-Benz ESF 2009 Experimental Safety Vehicle is a safety research vehicle based on the S400 Hybrid, unveiled in 2009.

Innovations 
Spotlight function: Production version called Night View Assist Plus with Spotlight Function, introduced on the Mercedes-Benz CL-Class (C216) in 2011.
Beltbag: Production version called Beltbag, introduced on the Mercedes-Benz S-Class (W222) in 2013.
Interactive Vehicle Communication: Production version called Car-to-X Communication with Drive Kit Plus, introduced on the Mercedes-Benz S-Class (W222) in 2013.
Full-LED headlamps with Partial main beam: Production version called Adaptive Highbeam Assist PLUS, introduced on the Mercedes-Benz S-Class (W222) in 2013.
PRE-SAFE Pulse: Production versions called PRE-SAFE Impulse, introduced on the Mercedes-Benz S-Class (W222) in 2013 and PRE-SAFE Impulse Side, introduced on the Mercedes-Benz E-Class (W213) in 2016.
Braking Bag
Child Protect System
Hybrid Battery Shield
Interseat Protection (Center airbag)
PRE-SAFE Structure
PRE-SAFE 360°
Rear seat camera
Side Reflect
Size Adaptive Airbags

The vehicle was unveiled at the Enhanced Safety of Vehicles (ESV) Conference in Stuttgart.

References

External links 

ESF
Automotive safety
Experimental vehicles